Oak Grove is a populated place in Dillon County, South Carolina, United States.

Geography
Drake is located at latitude 34.352 and longitude –79.543. The elevation is 131 feet.

Demographics

References

External links

Unincorporated communities in Dillon County, South Carolina
Unincorporated communities in South Carolina